This was the first edition of the tournament.

Marin and Tomislav Draganja won the title after defeating Dustin Brown and Tim Pütz 6–7(1–7), 6–2, [10–8] in the final.

Seeds

Draw

References
 Main Draw

Wolffkran Open - Doubles
2017 Doubles